In Maharashtra, there is one central university, twenty three state universities and twenty-one deemed universities.

Universities

Central University
 Mahatma Gandhi Antarrashtriya Hindi Vishwavidyalaya, Wardha.

State Universities

 granted university / State university status
|

National Law Universities

Deemed Universities

Private Universities
Private universities are approved by the UGC. They can grant degrees but they are not allowed to have off-campus affiliated colleges.

Engineering and Technology

Central Government
 Central Institute of Plastics Engineering and Technology, Aurangabad
 Indian Institute of Technology, Bombay
 Indian Institute of Information Technology, Nagpur
 Indian Institute of Information Technology, Pune
 National Fire Service College, Nagpur
 National Institute of Electronics & Information Technology, Aurangabad
  
National Institute of Industrial Engineering, Mumbai
  National Power Training Institute, Nagpur
 Visvesvaraya National Institute of Technology, Nagpur
 Central Institute of Plastics Engineering and Technology, Chandrapur

Government of Maharashtra

University managed

Deemed University (State funded)

Medical

Central government
 All India Institute of Medical Sciences, Nagpur

State government

Agriculture

 Central Institute of Cotton Research, Nagpur
 National Research Centre for Citrus, Nagpur
 Panjabrao Deshmukh Krishi Vidyapeeth, Akola

Armed force academies

Sainik School
 Sainik School, Satara
Sainik School , Chandrapur

Tri-service Institutes
 National Defence Academy, Khadakwasla

Indian Army
Army Institute of Technology
 College of Military Engineering, Pune
Defence Institute of Advanced Technology

Medical Personnel
 Armed Forces Medical College

Other institutions 
 National School of Leadership

See also
 List of institutions of higher education in Goa

References 

M